This is a list of notable shopping malls/shopping centres in Taipei, Taiwan.

Eastern District

Zhongxiao E. Rd.

Pacific Sogo (Zhongxiao Branch)
Pacific Sogo (Fuxing Branch)
Ming Yao Department Store
Breeze II
Tonlin Plaza
East Metro Mall

Fuxing S. Rd.

 Breeze Center
 Sunrise Department Store
 Howard Boutiques

Dunhua Rd.

Pacific Sogo (Dunhua Branch)
Asiaworld Shopping Mall
Eslite Dunnan Branch
Momo
The Mall

Xinyi District
Shin Kong Mitsukoshi (Xinyi New Life Square - A4, A8, A9, A11)
Vieshow Cinema
Taipei 101
BELLAVITA
FEDS Xinyi A13
Neo19
Eslite Xinyi Flagship Store
ATT 4 FUN
Citylink Songshan
Hankyu
Breeze Nanshan
Breeze Song Gao
Breeze Xinyi

Nangang District
Citylink Nangang
CTBC Financial Park Mall
Global Mall Nangang Station

Western District

Nanjing W. Rd.

Shin Kong Mitsukoshi (Nanjing W. Rd. Branch)
Idee Department Store
Breeze Nan Jing

Zhongxiao W. Rd.

Shin Kong Mitsukoshi (Taipei Station Branch)
KMall
Longshan Temple Underground Shopping Mall
Nova
Breeze Taipei Station
Qsquare
Syntrend Creative Park
Station Front Metro Mall
Taipei City Mall
Ximen Metro Mall
Zhongshan Metro Mall

Ximending

Eslite Ximen Branch
Eslite Wuchang Branch
Eslite 116
FE21 Department Store
Jun Plaza

Dazhi
ATT 4 Recharge
Miramar Entertainment Park

Northern District
Citylink Neihu

Tianmu
Shin Kong Mitsukoshi (Tianmu Branch)
Dayeh Takashimaya
Pacific Sogo (Tianmu Branch)

Southern District

Muzha

Zoo Mall

See also
 List of tourist attractions in Taiwan

Shopping malls
Taipei